Lottia persona is a species of sea snail, a true limpet, a marine gastropod mollusk in the family Lottiidae, one of the families of true limpets.

Description
L. persona is a large, moderately tall limpet growing to up to fifty millimetres long. The apex is not central, being about one third of the way along the shell which is dark olive-green with fine white markings and has fine radial ribs, though these have often been smoothed down by erosion. The anterior slope is straight or slightly concave.

Distribution
L. persona is found on the North American Pacific coast from Alaska to central California. It is a cryptic species, common to the high and mid-intertidal zones in sheltered rocky coasts. It is mostly found in crevices and caves and under overhangs. It is nocturnal, grazing on micro-algae when the rocks are wet.

References

Lottiidae
Molluscs of the Pacific Ocean
Taxa named by Martin Rathke
Gastropods described in 1833